Askjem is a village in the municipality of Indre Fosen in Trøndelag county, Norway. The village is located near the southern tip of the Fosen peninsula, just west of the village of Stadsbygd.

References

Villages in Trøndelag
Indre Fosen